The 2017 Surrey County Council election took place as part of the 2017 local elections in the UK. All 81 councillors were elected for single-member electoral divisions for a four-year term.   The electoral system used is first-past-the-post voting.

The result was Conservative councillors formed an increased majority on the council at the equivalent loss of three seats formerly won by UKIP.  Two tied second-largest party groupings of councillors were unaltered as to their seats, on net balance.  These were Liberal Democrats and an informal alliance of Independent and Residents Association councillors: nine councillors each.  The balance of two councillors continued as one Labour Party and one Green Party of England and Wales member.

Results summary

|-
|
| Independents and Residents' Associations
| align="right" | 9
|
|
| align="right" | 0
|
| align="right" | 9.7
| align="right" | 29,446
|
|-

|}

Division Results

An asterisk * indicates an incumbent seeking re-election.

Addlestone

Ash

Ashford

Ashtead

At the previous election the UKIP candidate polled 11%

Bagshot, Windlesham and Chobham

In the previous election the UKIP candidate polled 22%.

Banstead, Woodmansterne & Chipstead

Bookham and Fetcham West

Camberley East

At the previous election the UKIP candidate polled 30%.

Camberley West

Caterham Hill

Caterham Valley

In the previous election a Green Party candidate polled 5%.

Chertsey

Cobham

Cranleigh & Ewhurst

Dorking Hills

Dorking Rural

Dorking South and the Holmwoods

Earlswood and Reigate South

East Molesey and Esher

Egham

Englefield Green

Epsom Town & Downs

At the last election the UKIP candidate polled 13%.

Epsom West

At the last election the UKIP candidate polled 16%

Ewell

In the previous election the UKIP candidate polled 16%

Ewell Court, Auriol & Cuddington

In the last election the UKIP candidate polled 18%.

Farnham Central

At the past election the UKIP candidate polled 22%, the Independent candidate polled 18% and the Labour candidate polled 8%.

Farnham North

In the previous election the UKIP candidate polled 31%, an Independent candidate polled 18% and Labour polled 7%.

Farnham South

Foxhills, Thorpe and Virginia Water

Frimley Green and Mytchett

Godalming North

In the previous election the Labour candidate polled 16%.

Godalming South, Milford & Witley

In the previous election the UKIP candidate polled 22%.

Godstone

Goldsworth East and Horsell Village

Guildford East

At the last election the UKIP candidate polled 15%.

Guildford North

At the last election the UKIP candidate polled 21%.

Guildford South-East

At the last election the UKIP candidate polled 12%.

Guildford South-West

At the last election the UKIP candidate polled 13%.

Guildford West

 

At the last election the UKIP candidate polled 21%.

Haslemere

At the last election the Independent candidate polled 35%.

Heatherside and Parkside

In the 2013 election David Ivison won the seat for the Conservatives

Hersham

In the previous election a UKIP candidate polled 14%

Hinchley Wood, Claygate & Oxshott

Horley East

Horley West, Salfords and Sidlow

Horsleys

Knaphill and Goldsworth West

At the preceding election, an Independent candidate polled 10%.

Laleham and Shepperton

Leatherhead and Fetcham East

Lightwater, West End and Bisley

Lingfield

At the previous election the Independent candidate polled 30%.

Lower Sunbury & Halliford

Merstham and Banstead South

Nork and Tattenhams

At the previous election the UKIP candidate polled 18%.

Oxted

Redhill East

Redhill West and Meadvale

Reigate

Shalford

Shere

At the previous election the UKIP candidate polled 23%.

Staines

Staines South & Ashford West

Stanwell & Stanwell Moor

At the preceding election an Independent candidate polled 11%.

Sunbury Common & Ashford Common

Tadworth, Walton and Kingswood

The Byfleets

The Dittons

In the previous election a UKIP candidate polled 14%

Walton

In the previous election a Walton Society candidate polled 32%

Walton South & Oatlands

Warlingham

Waverley Eastern Villages

Waverley Western Villages

In the previous election the UKIP candidate polled 22% and the Labour candidate polled 7%.

West Ewell

At the last election the UKIP candidate polled 18%.

West Molesey

In the previous election the UKIP candidate polled 13%

Weybridge

Woking North

Woking South

Woking South East

Woking South West

Woodham and New Haw

Worplesdon

At the previous election the UKIP candidate polled 22%.

References

2017
2017 English local elections
2010s in Surrey